George Jefferson (George Gordon Jefferson; February 28, 1910 – February 13, 1996) was an American athlete who competed mainly in the pole vault. He was born in Inglewood, California.

A student at UCLA, Jefferson competed for the United States in the 1932 Summer Olympics held in Los Angeles, United States in the pole vault where he won the bronze medal.

References 
 

1910 births
1996 deaths
American male pole vaulters
Olympic bronze medalists for the United States in track and field
Athletes (track and field) at the 1932 Summer Olympics
Sportspeople from Inglewood, California
Track and field athletes from California
Medalists at the 1932 Summer Olympics